Franco Stella may refer to:

 Gianfranco Stella Italian cross-country skier
 Franco Stella Italian architect